, also known as "Nin-Nin" or simply "Pom G", is a Japanese game director, game designer and character designer.

Nishitani started working for Capcom in 1986, where he became mostly known for designing Street Fighter II and Final Fight alongside Akira Yasuda, aka Akiman. In 1995, he left Capcom to found his own company, Arika, whose first works were on the Street Fighter EX series they developed for Capcom.

References

External links
 nin_arika on Twitter

1967 births
Japanese animators
Japanese video game producers
Japanese video game designers
Living people
Capcom people